Cardiastethus is a genus of minute pirate bugs in the family Lyctocoridae. There are more than 20 described species in Cardiastethus.

Species
These 23 species belong to the genus Cardiastethus:

 Cardiastethus assimilis (Reuter, 1871) i c g b
 Cardiastethus borealis Kelton, 1977 i c g b
 Cardiastethus brevirostris
 Cardiastethus brounianus
 Cardiastethus consors
 Cardiastethus elegans
 Cardiastethus exiguus Poppius, 1913 g
 Cardiastethus fasciiventris (Garbiglietti, 1869) g
 Cardiastethus flaveolus Blatchley, 1928 i c g
 Cardiastethus flavus Poppius, 1909 g
 Cardiastethus fulvescens (Walker, 1872) i c
 Cardiastethus hiurai
 Cardiastethus kathmandu
 Cardiastethus laeviusculus Poppius, 1915 g
 Cardiastethus linnavuorii
 Cardiastethus longiceps Poppius, 1915 g
 Cardiastethus luridellus (Fieber, 1860) i c g
 Cardiastethus minutissimus Usinger, 1946 i c g
 Cardiastethus nazarenus Reuter, 1884 g
 Cardiastethus nepalensis 
 Cardiastethus pergandei Reuter, 1884 i c g
 Cardiastethus poweri
 Cardiastethus pseudococci Wagner, 1951 g

Data sources: i = ITIS, c = Catalogue of Life, g = GBIF, b = Bugguide.net

References

 Yamada, K. 2016. Cardiastethus brevirostris and its close relatives from Asia, with descriptions of four new species (Hemiptera: Heteroptera: Anthocoridae). Entomologia Americana 122(1-2), pages 1–17,

External links 

 

 
 Cardiastethus  at insectoid.info
 

Cimicomorpha genera
Lyctocoridae